The Rock is a 1996 American action thriller film directed by Michael Bay, produced by Don Simpson and Jerry Bruckheimer, and written by David Weisberg, Douglas S. Cook and Mark Rosner. The film stars Sean Connery, Nicolas Cage and Ed Harris, with William Forsythe and Michael Biehn co-starring. In the film, the Pentagon assigns a team comprising an FBI chemist and a former SAS captain with a team of SEALs to break into Alcatraz, where a rogue general and a rogue group of Marines have seized all the tourists on the island and have threatened to launch rockets filled with nerve gas upon San Francisco unless the U.S. government pays $100 million to the next-of-kin of 83 men who were killed on missions that the general led and that the Pentagon denied.

The Rock was dedicated to the memory of co-producer Don Simpson, who died five months before its release. The film received positive reviews from critics, and was nominated for Best Sound at the 69th Academy Awards. It was also a financial success, earning box-office receipts of over $335 million against a production budget of $75 million, and became the fourth highest-grossing film of 1996.

Plot
Disillusioned Brigadier General Francis Hummel and his second-in-command Major Tom Baxter lead a rogue group of U.S. Force Recon Marines against a heavily guarded naval weapons depot to steal a stockpile of VX gas-loaded M55 rockets. The next day, Hummel and his men seize control of Alcatraz Island, taking the tourists and guards hostages. Hummel contacts the FBI and the Pentagon, threatening to launch the rockets against San Francisco unless the U.S. government pays him $100 million from a military slush fund, which he will distribute to his men and the families of Recon Marines who died on covert missions under his command, but whose deaths were not compensated.

The Department of Defense and the FBI develop a plan to retake the island using a U.S. Navy SEAL team led by Commander Anderson; the FBI's top chemical weapons specialist, Dr. Stanley Goodspeed; and the only inmate ever to escape Alcatraz: John Mason. FBI Director James Womack bribes Mason with a pardon, and Mason reluctantly agrees, but Womack subsequently destroys the pardon, and Mason is set up in a hotel. He escapes, resulting in a car chase with Goodspeed through the streets of San Francisco as Mason reunites with his estranged daughter, Jade Angelou.

The team successfully infiltrates Alcatraz, but Hummel's men are alerted to their presence and ambush them in a shower room. Anderson and all of the SEALs are killed, leaving only Mason and Goodspeed alive. Goodspeed wants to finish the mission and attempts to strong-arm Mason into helping. Mason, seeing his chance to escape custody, disarms Goodspeed. Mason changes his mind about helping Goodspeed for the safety of his daughter.

Mason and Goodspeed eliminate several teams of Marines and disable twelve of the fifteen rockets by removing their guidance chips. Hummel threatens to execute a hostage if they do not surrender and return the chips; Mason destroys them before surrendering to Hummel to try reasoning with him and stall for time. Goodspeed disables another rocket but then gets captured. With the incursion team lost, the backup plan is initiated: an airstrike by F/A-18Cs with thermite plasma, which will neutralize the poison gas but also kill everyone on the island.

Mason and Goodspeed escape, and Mason explains why he was held prisoner: he was a former British SAS captain and MI6 operative who was captured after stealing a microfilm containing details of the United States' most closely guarded secrets. Knowing he would be "suicided" if he returned it, he spent the last thirty years imprisoned without trial for refusing to hand it over.

When Hummel's deadline for the ransom passes, he is urged by his men to fire a rocket. Although he does, he redirects it to detonate at sea. When confronted by Darrow and Frye, Hummel explains the rocket threat was an elaborate bluff, as he had never intended to harm innocent civilians. He declares the mission over and orders them to exit Alcatraz with some hostages and the remaining rocket to cover their retreat while he assumes the blame. Darrow and Frye, realizing they will not be getting the money, mutiny against him. A firefight ensues; Baxter is killed defending Hummel, who is mortally wounded. The general manages to tell Goodspeed where the last rocket is before dying.

Darrow and Frye proceed with the plan to fire on San Francisco. Goodspeed seeks out the rocket while Mason deals with the remaining Marines. As the jets approach, Goodspeed disables the rocket before killing Darrow and Frye. Though he signals that the threat is over, one jet accidentally drops a bomb. No hostages are injured, but the blast throws Goodspeed into the bay, and Mason rescues him.

Goodspeed reports a successful mission but lies that Mason died during the blast; he admits to Mason that Womack tore up the pardon and offers him a way off the island and where to find cash in his hotel room. Grateful, Mason reveals the location of the microfilm as he and Goodspeed part ways. Sometime later, Goodspeed and his newlywed wife Carla hastily drive away from a church in Kansas after having retrieved the microfilm.

Cast

In addition, Stuart Wilson appears as General Al Kramer, Chairman of the Joint Chiefs of Staff, with David Marshall Grant as White House Chief of Staff Hayden Sinclair.

Production
Jonathan Hensleigh participated in writing the script, which became the subject of a dispute with the Writers Guild of America. The spec script (by David Weisberg and Douglas Cook) was reworked by several writers, but other than the original team, Mark Rosner was the only one granted official credit by guild arbitration. The rule is that the credited writing team must contribute 50% of the final script (effectively limiting credits to the screenplay's initial authors, plus one re-write team). Despite their work on the script, neither Hensleigh nor Aaron Sorkin was credited in the film. The director Michael Bay wrote an open letter of protest, in which he criticized the arbitration procedure as a "sham" and a "travesty".  He said Hensleigh had worked closely with him on the movie and should have received screen credit. Quentin Tarantino was also an uncredited screenwriter.

Los Angeles-based British screenwriting team Dick Clement and Ian La Frenais were brought in at Connery's request to rewrite his lines, but ended up altering much of the film's dialogue. It was Nicolas Cage's idea that his character would not swear; his euphemisms include "gee whiz." Bay had worked closely with Ed Harris to develop his character as concretely as possible, later adding a sympathetic edge to Hummel.

There were tensions during shooting between director Bay and Walt Disney Studios executives who were supervising the production. On the commentary track for the Criterion Collection DVD, Bay recalls a time when he was preparing to leave the set for a meeting with the executives when he was approached by Sean Connery in golfing attire. Connery, who also produced the film, asked Bay where he was going, and when Bay explained he had a meeting with the executives, Connery asked if he could accompany him. Bay complied and when he arrived in the conference room, the executives' jaws dropped when they saw Connery appear behind him. According to Bay, Connery then stood up for Bay and insisted that he was doing a good job and should be left alone.

Most of the film was shot on location in the Alcatraz Prison on Alcatraz Island. As it is governed by the National Park Service, it was not possible to close down Alcatraz, and much of the filming had to accommodate tour parties milling around. The scene in which FBI Director Womack is thrown off the balcony was filmed on location at the Fairmont Hotel in San Francisco. The filming led to numerous calls to the hotel by people who saw a man dangling from the balcony. The film's closing scene was shot outside the historic Sacred Heart Mission Church in Saticoy, California.

At one point, Arnold Schwarzenegger was to have played the role of Goodspeed. Schwarzenegger turned the role down because he did not like the script.

Controversy

Censorship
In the original UK DVD release, the scene in which Connery throws a knife through Scarpetti's throat and says "you must never hesitate" to Cage was cut, although the scene was shown on British television. Consequently, a later scene in which Connery says to Cage, "I'm rather glad you didn't hesitate too long," lost its impact on viewers who had not seen the first scene. Other cuts included the reduction of multiple gunshot impacts into Gamble's feet in the morgue down to a single hit; a close-up of his screaming face as the air conditioner falls onto him; a sound cut to Mason snapping a Marine's neck and two bloody gunshot wounds (to Hummel and Baxter), both near the end of the film.

Iraqi chemical weapons program
A scene from the film was the basis for incorrect and false descriptions of the Iraqi chemical weapons program. Britain's Secret Intelligence Service was led to believe Saddam Hussein was continuing to produce weapons of mass destruction by a false agent who based his reports on the movie, according to the Chilcot Inquiry.

In September 2002, MI6 chief Sir Richard Dearlove said the agency had acquired information from a new source revealing that Iraq was stepping up production of chemical and biological warfare agents. The source, who was said to have "direct access", claimed senior staff were working seven days a week while the regime was concentrating a great deal of effort on the production of anthrax. Dearlove told the chairman of the Joint Intelligence Committee (JIC), Sir John Scarlett, that they were "on the edge of (a) significant intel breakthrough" which could be the "key to unlock" Iraq's weapons programme.

However, questions were raised about the agent's claims when it was noticed his description bore a striking resemblance to a scene from the film. "It was pointed out that glass containers were not typically used in chemical munitions, and that a popular movie (The Rock) had inaccurately depicted nerve agents being carried in glass beads or spheres," the Chilcot report stated. By February 2003 – a month before the invasion of Iraq – MI6 concluded that their source had been lying "over a period of time" but failed to inform No 10 or others, even though  Prime Minister Tony Blair had been briefed on this intelligence. According to The Independent, the false claims of weapons of mass destruction were the justification for UK's entering the war.

The film's co-writer David Weisberg said, "What was so amazing was anybody in the poison gas community would immediately know that this was total bullshit – such obvious bullshit". Weisberg said he was unsurprised a desperate agent might resort to films for inspiration, but dismayed that authorities "didn't do apparently the most basic fact-checking or vetting of the information. If you'd just asked a chemical weapons expert, it would have been immediately obvious it was ludicrous". Weisberg said he had had some "funny emails" after the report, but he felt "it's not a nice legacy for the film". "It's tragic that we went to war," he concluded.

Music
The soundtrack to The Rock was released on the same day as the film, June 7, 1996, by Hollywood Records. Nick Glennie-Smith and Hans Zimmer were the principal composers, while Harry Gregson-Williams was the score producer, with additional music composed by Don Harper, Steven M. Stern and Gregson-Williams.

Reception

Box office
Produced on a $75 million budget, The Rock grossed a total of $134 million in the U.S. and Canada and $201 million elsewhere, for a worldwide total of $335 million. It was the seventh-highest grossing film for the U.S. box office in 1996, and the fourth highest-grossing U.S. film worldwide that year.

Critical response
On Rotten Tomatoes, the film has an approval rating of 68% based on 71 reviews, with an average rating of 6.7/10. The website's critics consensus reads: "For visceral thrills, it can't be beat. Just don't expect The Rock to engage your brain." On Metacritic, the film has a weighted average score of 58 out of 100, based on 24 critics, indicating "mixed or average reviews". Audiences polled by CinemaScore gave the film an average grade of "A" on an A+ to F scale.

Roger Ebert awarded the film 3.5 out of 4 stars, praising it as "a first-rate, slam-bang action thriller with a lot of style and no little humor". Todd McCarthy of Variety gave the film a positive review, commenting "The yarn has its share of gaping holes and jaw-dropping improbabilities, but director Michael Bay sweeps them all aside with his never-take-a-breath pacing." Richard Corliss, writing for the Time expressed favorable opinions towards the film, saying "Slick, brutal and almost human, this is the team-spirit action movie Mission: Impossible should have been."

Accolades
The Rock won several minor awards, including 'Best On-Screen Duo' for Connery and Cage at the MTV Movie Awards. It was also nominated for an Academy Award for Best Sound (Kevin O'Connell, Greg P. Russell and Keith A. Wester).

The film was selected for a limited edition DVD release by the Criterion Collection, a distributor of primarily arthouse films it categorizes as "important classic and contemporary films" and "cinema at its finest". In an essay supporting the selection of The Rock, Roger Ebert, who was strongly critical of most of Bay's later films, gave the film 3 1/2 out of four stars, calling it "an action picture that rises to the top of the genre because of a literate, witty screenplay and skilled craftsmanship in the direction and special effects."

In 2014, Time Out polled several film critics, directors, actors and stunt actors to list their top action films. The Rock was listed at 74th place on the list.

In 2019, Tom Reimann from Collider ranked The Rock as Michael Bay's best film: "The Rock is not only Michael Bay’s finest film, it’s also a perfect snapshot of the height of 90s action movies."

Abandoned sequel
In June 2017, director Michael Bay discussed his idea for a follow-up to The Rock that never developed past the concept that Goodspeed and Mason are chased by the government after escaping, due to possession of the microfilm as shown in the ending.

See also
 List of films featuring the United States Navy SEALs

References

External links

 
 
 
 
 
 The Rock an essay by Roger Ebert at the Criterion Collection

1996 films
1996 action thriller films
1990s buddy films
1990s English-language films
1990s prison films
Alcatraz Island in fiction
American action thriller films
American buddy action films
American prison films
Films about bomb disposal
Films about chemical war and weapons
Films about the Federal Bureau of Investigation
Films about hostage takings
Films about terrorism in the United States
Films about the United States Marine Corps
Films about United States Navy SEALs
Films directed by Michael Bay
Films produced by Don Simpson
Films produced by Jerry Bruckheimer
Films scored by Nick Glennie-Smith
Films scored by Hans Zimmer
Films set in the San Francisco Bay Area
Films set in Virginia
Films set in Washington, D.C.
Films set on islands
Films shot in Los Angeles
Films shot in San Francisco
Films shot in Ventura County, California
Films with screenplays by Douglas S. Cook
Films with screenplays by David Weisberg
Hollywood Pictures films
1990s American films